Neville Bruns (born 3 October 1958) is a former Australian rules footballer in the Victorian/Australian Football League for Geelong Football Club. He wore the number 19 during his tenure at the club and played often in the wing and rover positions. From 1978 to 1992 he played 223 games (including the 1989 and 1992 Grand Finals) and kicked 174 goals. He received a total of 33 Brownlow votes in his career.

In 1985, Leigh Matthews infamously king hit Bruns and broke his jaw. Although no reports were made at the time, the Victorian Football League (VFL) Commissioners subsequently investigated the incident, found Matthews to be responsible and deregistered him for four weeks. Matthews then faced a criminal charge of assault, to which he pleaded guilty, and was fined $1,000. This resulted in much debate over the role of the police in sporting incidents.

Neville Bruns formerly worked as the Victorian State Manager for Sportsco and was also the National Operations Manager for an Australian trade and industrial tool retailer, Total Tools. He is now retired and lives with his wife Karen in the Geelong area.

Neville Bruns also worked as a teacher at Geelong College in the 1980s.

References

External links
 

1958 births
Geelong Football Club players
Australian rules footballers from Victoria (Australia)
Living people
Victorian State of Origin players
Australia international rules football team players